The Malik are ethnic community found in Pakistan.

References 

Punjabi tribes
Social groups of Punjab, Pakistan